The Marquess of Anglesey's Column (also known as Anglesey Column or by the Welsh name Tŵr Marcwis) is a Doric column near the Menai Strait in Wales. It is dedicated to Henry William Paget (the first Marquess of Anglesey) to commemorate his valour in the Napoleonic Wars. The column is a Grade II* listed building.

The  monument (designed by Thomas Harrison) was erected close to Paget's country retreat at Plas Newydd, in 1817. 
On the foundation stone there is an inscription, which also reads in Welsh and Latin;
The inhabitants of the counties of Anglesey and Caernarvon have erected this column in grateful commemoration of the distinguished military achievements of their countryman HENRY WILLIAM, MARQUESS OF ANGLESEY the leader of the British Cavalry in Spain throughout the arduous Campaign of 1807 and Second in Command of the Armies confederated against France at the memorable battle of Waterloo on the 18th of June 1815. Thomas Harrison Architect.

During the battle of Waterloo, Paget (at that time Lord Uxbridge) lost his leg to a cannonball hit. It is claimed he turned to 
Lord Wellington when his leg was hit, and exclaimed, "By God, sir, I've lost my leg!" — to which Wellington replied, "By God, sir, so you have!". Paget was later fitted with the first ever articulated wooden leg.

The column stands on an outcrop of blueschist rock, formed when pillow lavas have been metamorphosed under high pressure but relatively low temperature. This example is amongst the oldest known in the world, and in 2010 the site was declared a Geological Site of Special Scientific Interest. It is a star feature of the GeoMôn UNESCO Global Geopark

Statue 

The monument was not completed until 1860 (after the Marquess had died) when the brass sculpture at the top was
added. Matthew Noble sculpted the statue.

Decline and restoration attempts 
In recent years, the condition of the column has deteriorated. Many of the wooden steps in the tower have rotted, and pose a severe fire risk. As a result, the column closed to the public in March 2012, with no formal restoration proposals agreed. The last 'Column Keeper' was Mr David Blackmore who lived in the cottage and took care of the site for 20 years.

In 2017, the 200th year of the column's life, a charity, the Anglesey Column Trust, was set up to look into the possibility of repairing and re-opening the column. In 2018, £60,000 funding from the National Lottery was awarded towards restoring the column which was used to further assess work needed and prepare further funding applications. In September 2020, £19,300 was granted  by The National Lottery Heritage Fund's Emergency section for the installation of CCTV and other security features. In July 2021 the largest grant to date of £872,000 was given. This will allow not only the re-opening of the column but parking to be made available, a visitor centre opened in the cottage and a viewing platform for disabled visitors to use. All in all it is hoped six new jobs will be created.

References

Buildings and structures completed in 1817
Columns related to the Napoleonic Wars
Column
Grade II* listed buildings in Anglesey
Grade II* listed monuments and memorials in Wales
Monuments and memorials in Anglesey
Monumental columns in Wales
Llanfairpwllgwyngyll
Battle of Waterloo
Neoclassical architecture in Wales
Statues in Wales